Amelia was a ship of 1,000 or 1,400 tons (bm), built at Demaun. In 1796 the British East India Company (EIC) engaged her in India to carry rice from Bengal to Britain for the account of the British government, which was importing grain to address high prices for wheat in Britain following a poor harvest.

As Amelia approached Britain a French squadron captured her. By some reports the capture took place in the Bay of Biscay. However, Lloyd's List reported that a squadron of French frigates had captured an East Indiaman, "supposed to be the Amelia, from Bengal", with a cargo of rice and sugar. The capture apparently took place off the Western Isles, and the captors sent their prize into Corunna. The next issue of Lloyd's List confirmed that Amelia had been sent into Corunna, and identified her master as "Crawford".

The EIC charged the loss of the cargo to "his Majesty's Government".

Reportedly, a Bombay house later purchased Amelia and sold her to the Portuguese at Macao.

Notes, citations, and references
Notes

Citations

References
Hackman, Rowan (2001) Ships of the East India Company. (Gravesend, Kent: World Ship Society). 
Phipps, John, (of the Master Attendant's Office, Calcutta), (1840) A Collection of Papers Relative to Ship Building in India ...: Also a Register Comprehending All the Ships ... Built in India to the Present Time .... (Scott).
Report from the Select Committee of the House of Commons appointed to enquire into the present state of the affairs of the East India Company, together with the minutes of evidence, an appendix of documents, and a general index, (1830).

1790s ships
British ships built in India
Ships of the British East India Company
Captured ships
Merchant ships of the United Kingdom
Age of Sail merchant ships